Deborah Reynolds CB served as the Chief Veterinary Officer (CVO) of the United Kingdom from March 2004 until she retired in November 2007. She is usually referred to as Debby Reynolds, or less often as Deborah Reynolds.

Chief Veterinary Officer
Reynolds was the Chief Veterinary Officer (CVO) of the United Kingdom and for the Department for Environment, Food and Rural Affairs (DEFRA) from March 2004 to 9 November 2007. As CVO, Reynolds was the British government's main spokesperson on animal health, and was in the British nationwide news repeatedly to explain policy and answer questions about outbreaks or control of serious animal infections, such as foot-and-mouth disease, H5N1 bird flu, bovine TB, rabies and bluetongue virus.

On 9 November 2007, DEFRA announced that Reynolds had opted to take early retirement at the age of 55 years, and that the Deputy CVO Fred Landeg would take over temporarily as acting CVO with immediate effect.

She was invested as a Companion of the Order of the Bath (CB) in the New Year Honours 2008.

Personal life
Reynolds is a keen birdwatcher and was a member of the Reading Ornithology Club in the 1980s. Her husband keeps show game fowl, chickens and bantams.

In 2012 she was elected to the Council of the National Trust.

Career
1970 to 1975 - Studied veterinary science at the University of Bristol, a 5-year course, gained an honours degree, BVSc
? dates - PhD in the epidemiology of enteric viruses in calves, University of Reading
? dates - Research Officer at the Institute for Animal Health
1984 to 1994 - Worked in the Veterinary Investigation Service of the State Veterinary Service and moved to the Ministry of Agriculture, Fisheries and Food (MAFF) in 1991 where she worked until 1994
1994 to 1997 - Head of the Bacteriology Department at the Veterinary Laboratories Agency
1997 to 2001 - Head of Endemic Animal Disease and Zoonoses at MAFF, which subsequently became DEFRA
2001 to 2004 - Veterinary Director of the Food Standards Agency
March 2004 to 9 November 2007 - Chief Veterinary Officer for DEFRA and the United Kingdom

References

Alumni of the University of Bristol
British veterinarians
Companions of the Order of the Bath
Living people
Women veterinarians
Year of birth missing (living people)